Drive mapping is how Microsoft Windows associates a local drive letter (A through Z) with a shared storage area to another computer (often referred as a File Server) over a network. After a drive has been mapped, a software application on a client's computer can read and write files from the shared storage area by accessing that drive, just as if that drive represented a local physical hard disk drive.

Drive mapping 
Mapped drives are hard drives (even if located on a virtual or cloud computing system, or network drives) which are always represented by names, letter(s), or number(s) and they are often followed by additional strings of data, directory tree branches, or alternate level(s) separated by a "\" symbol. Drive mapping is used to locate directories, files or objects, and programs or apps, and is needed by end users, administrators, and various other operators or groups.

Mapped drives are usually assigned a letter of the alphabet after the first few taken, such as A:\, B:\ (both of which were historically removable flexible magnetic media drives), C:\ (usually the first or only installed hard disk), and D:\ (which was often an optical drive unit). Then, with the drive and/or directory (letters, symbols, numbers, names) mapped, they can be entered into the necessary address bar/location(s) and displayed as in the following:

Example 1:

C:\level\next level\following level

or

C:\BOI60471CL\Shared Documents\Multi-Media Dept

The preceding location may reach something like a company's multi-media department's database, which logically is represented with the entire string "C:\BDB60471CL\Shared Documents\Multi-Media Dept". 

Mapping a drive can be complicated for a complex system. Network mapped drives (on LANs or WANs) are available only when the host computer (File Server) is also available (i.e. online): it is a requirement for use of drives on a host. All data on various mapped drives will have certain permissions set (most newer systems) and the user will need the particular security authorizations to access it.

Drive mapping over LAN usually uses the SMB protocol on Windows or NFS protocol on UNIX/Linux (however UNIX/Linux do not map devices to drive letters as MS-DOS and Windows do). Drive mapping over the Internet usually uses the WebDAV protocol. WebDAV Drive mapping is supported on Windows, Mac, and Linux.

See also
Mount (computing)
Drive letter assignment
SUBST – a command on the DOS, IBM OS/2 and Microsoft Windows operating systems used for substituting paths on physical and logical drives as virtual drives
Disk formatting

References

Windows architecture
Computer peripherals
Network file systems